Stéphane Séjourné (born 26 March 1985) is a French lawyer and politician who was elected as a Member of the European Parliament (MEP) in 2019. Since 2021 he has led Renew Europe.

Early life and education 
Séjourné grew up in Buenos Aires and later did an exchange program in Spain.

Early career 
After working in the office of Jean-Paul Huchon at the Regional Council of Île-de-France from 2012 to 2014, Séjourné became an adviser to Minister of the Economy and Finance Emmanuel Macron.

When Macron became president in the 2017 elections, Séjourné came along as a political adviser, working alongside Alexis Kohler and Ismaël Emelien. He then took a four-month-long leave of absence to lead LREM’s campaign for the 2019 European elections.

Political career 
Since entering parliament, Séjourné has been serving on the Committee on Legal Affairs. In 2020, he also joined the Special Committee on Artificial Intelligence in a Digital Age.

In addition to his committee assignments, Séjourné is part of the Parliament's delegations for relations with Mercosur and the Euro-Latin American Parliamentary Assembly. He is also a member of the European Parliament Intergroup on Artificial Intelligence and Digital, the European Parliament Intergroup on Children’s Rights, the MEPs Against Cancer group and the European Internet Forum.

Following the resignation of Dacian Cioloş in 2021, Séjourné announced his candidacy for the leadership of the Renew Europe in the European Parliament.

Political positions
Séjourné is considered a close ally of President Emmanuel Macron.

Personal life
Séjourné is in a civil union with fellow LREM politician Gabriel Attal.

References

1985 births
Living people
Gay politicians
La République En Marche! politicians
La République En Marche! MEPs
LGBT MEPs for France
MEPs for France 2019–2024
People from Versailles
University of Poitiers alumni